Elias Magnus Fries  (15 August 1794 – 8 February 1878) was a Swedish mycologist and botanist. He is sometimes called the "Linnaeus of Mycology".

Career 
Fries was born at Femsjö (Hylte Municipality), Småland, the son of the pastor there. He attended school in Växjö.

He acquired an extensive knowledge of flowering plants from his father. In 1811 Fries entered Lund University where he obtained a doctorate in 1814. In the same year he was appointed an associate professorship in botany. He was elected a member of the Royal Swedish Academy of Sciences, and in 1824, became a full professor. In 1834 he became Borgström professor (Swed. Borgströmianska professuren, a chair endowed by Erik Eriksson Borgström, 1708–1770) in applied economics at Uppsala University. The position was changed to "professor of botany and applied economics" in 1851. He was elected a Foreign Honorary Member of the American Academy of Arts and Sciences in 1849. That year he was also appointed director of the Uppsala University Botanical Garden. In 1853, he became rector of the University.

Fries most important works were the three-volume Systema mycologicum (1821–1832), Elenchus fungorum (1828), the two-volume Monographia hymenomycetum Sueciae (1857 and 1863) and Hymenomycetes Europaei (1874).

Fries is considered to be, after Christian Hendrik Persoon, a founding father of the modern taxonomy of mushrooms. His taxonomy of mushrooms was influenced by Goethe and the German romantics. He utilized spore color and arrangement of the hymenophore (pores, gills, teeth etc.) as major taxonomic characteristics.

He died in Uppsala on 8 February 1878.

When he died, The Times commented: "His very numerous works, especially on fungi and lichens, give him a position as regards those groups of plants only comparable to that of Linnaeus". Fries was succeeded in the Borgström professorship (from 1859 to 1876) by Johan Erhard Areschoug, after whom Theodor Magnus Fries, the son of Elias, held the chair (from 1877 to 1899).

Publications
Monographia Pyrenomycetum Sueciae (1816)
Systema Mycologicum (1821)
Systema Orbis Vegetabilis (1825)
Elenchus Fungorem (1828)
Lichenographia Europaea Reformata (1831)
Epicrisis Systematis Mycologici: seu synopsis hymenomycetum (1838)

Botanical Reference

Family

His son was Theodor Magnus Fries. His grandsons Thore Christian Elias Fries and Robert Elias Fries also became botanists.

References

External links
 
"Elias Magnus Fries", Authors of fungal names, Mushroom, the Journal of Wild Mushrooming.
Web site of the Descendants of Elias Fries Association

1794 births
1878 deaths
People from Hylte Municipality
Botanists with author abbreviations
Swedish botanists
Swedish phycologists
Bryologists
Pteridologists
Swedish mycologists
Fellows of the American Academy of Arts and Sciences
Foreign Members of the Royal Society
Members of the Swedish Academy
Members of the Royal Swedish Academy of Sciences
Corresponding members of the Saint Petersburg Academy of Sciences
People from Småland
Lund University alumni
Academic staff of Lund University
Academic staff of Uppsala University
Honorary Fellows of the Royal Society of Edinburgh
Fellows of the Linnean Society of London
Burials at Uppsala old cemetery